TIDEL Park is an information technology (IT) park situated in the city of Chennai, India. The name TIDEL is a portmanteau of TIDCO and ELCOT. An ISO 9001/14001 company, In 2000, it was one of the largest IT parks in Asia. It was set up in 2000 to foster the growth of information technology in the state of Tamil Nadu by the TIDEL Park Ltd, a joint venture of TIDCO and ELCOT.

Location
TIDEL Park is located in Chennai and was inaugurated in 2000 by the then Chief Minister of Tamil Nadu M. Karunanidhi. TIDEL Park is located on the six-lane Rajiv Gandhi Salai in Taramani opposite to the Thiruvanmiyur MRTS Railway Station and close to the Rajiv Gandhi Salai–Thiruvanmiyur West Avenue Junction, a high-density traffic junction used by about 30,000 vehicles a day.

The building

Infrastructure
Built on a land covering 8 acres, the building has a 650-seat auditorium, a 130-seat conference hall, a 16,000 sq ft multi-cuisine food court and space to park 4,000 two-wheelers and 1,200 cars. The building has 19 elevators and 2 escalators. The ground floor and the first floor houses common facilities such as restaurant, banks, shops, health clubs, auditoriums, business centre and department stores. The ground floor consists of the auditorium, TIDEL administrative office, food court, banks and Bharath Sanchar Nigam Limited (BSNL) and Videsh Sanchar Nigam Limited (VSNL) offices. Built at a cost of  1 crore, the park provides network connectivity with direct satellite uplink. The building was designed by C N Raghavendran and was commissioned on 4 July 2000 built in a time of 15 months from the date of commencement of its construction. It has the world's 3rd largest TES systems for ACMV. For the first time in the country, a thermal energy storage system for air-conditioning was used in the building. An integrated building management system was also incorporated to take care of safety and security. The design of the building provides office space of various sizes ranging from a small office of 4,500 sq ft to a whole floor of 90,000 sq ft on any floor.

VSNL, DoT and STPI have provided exclusive support services to the park. Two dedicated communication backbones created with TIDEL for operation by VSNL and STPI have been provided. Each office module has facility for a bandwidth of 10-12 Mbit/s. The Tamil Nadu Electricity Board (TNEB) has set up an exclusive 110 kV sub-station. The facility has been provided a 10.5 MVA diesel genset for full back-up requirement.

Finance
The  320 crore project cost has an equity portion of  94 crore and a debt portion of  226 crore. The Tamil Nadu government holds a preferential equity of  40 crore in lieu of the land allotted for the project, while the balance  54 crore equity has been split between TIDCO, ELCOT, the EPC contractor, banks, insurance companies and financial institutions. The project has a debt-equity ratio of 2.4:1, with the debt portion having a government guarantee.

Future developments

TIDEL Park 1

'TIDEL Park' is jointly promoted by TIDEL Park Ltd and DLF. It is to be built adjacent to Institute of Road Transport Technology in Taramani. The site has an MRTS line passing through it. DLF has walked out of the project citing delay in getting approvals for IT SEZ, it has been rumoured that the company has requested the Tamil Nadu government to refund the  700 Crore. it had deposited for the Project.

TIDEL Park Avadi (Pattabiram) 
Tidel Park III is likely to come up on more than 45 acres of land in Avadi–Pattabiram, a western suburb of Chennai. This project includes a five-star hotel, convention centre and residential flats apart from the IT park. Phase 1 of the project with a single tower of 21 floors and 557,000 square feet of office space including a hanging garden is expected to open by 2023. The site is owned by the state government, the 45 acres of land is on the Chennai-Tiruvallur High Road. As of July 2020, the work has been started.

TIDEL Park, Coimbatore
In 2010, the Tidel Park Coimbatore was built at a cost of  380 crore as a joint initiative of the Tamil Nadu Industrial Development Corporation, Electronics Corporation of India, Software Technology Parks of India and TIDEL Park, Chennai.
. The Tidel Park, Coimbatore has built-up area of 1,713,000 sq ft and provide employment to 11,500 IT and ITES professionals. Conceived in August 2006, foundation stone for the Park was laid in February 2007, but the evacuation work began in November 2007 and the civil works contract was awarded only in September 2008. The park has 3 underground + 4 floors and the office space is available from smallest module of 5000 sq ft up to 2,00,000 sq ft with back up power from 5 × 2000 kVA DG sets. At present 77 companies occupy the IT Park with almost 100% occupancy.

TIDEL Park, Coimbatore, Phase II
Due to huge demand from IT Companies for Space at Coimbatore, TIDEL Park Coimbatore Phase II is planned to be built within ELCOT SEZ on 9 acres of land at 2,500 million. Already Request for Proposal (RFP) has been rolled out to appoint consultant for conducting market survey to prepare a techno economic feasibility report for establishing an Phase II of TIDEL Park.

TIDEL Park, Madurai, Phase I

TIDEL park for Madurai is announced in the cost of 600 crores. near Mattuthavani.

See also

 List of tallest buildings in Chennai
 Architecture of Chennai

References

External links 

Official homepage

Software technology parks in Chennai
Office highrises in Chennai